Paraduba is a genus of butterflies in the family Lycaenidae. The species of this genus are found in New Guinea (Australasian realm).

Species
Paraduba metriodes Bethune-Baker, 1911
Paraduba owgarra Bethune-Baker, 1906
Paraduba siwiensis Tite, 1963

External links

"Paraduba Bethune-Baker, 1906" at Markku Savela's Lepidoptera and Some Other Life Forms

Polyommatini
Lycaenidae genera